The following Confederate States Army units and commanders fought in the Second Battle of Winchester. The Union order of battle is listed separately.

Military rank abbreviations
 LTG = Lieutenant General
 MG = Major General
 BG = Brigadier General
 Col = Colonel
 Ltc = Lieutenant Colonel
 Maj = Major
 Cpt = Captain

Confederate army
Second Corps, Army of Northern Virginia (22651 officers & men) 
LTG Richard S. Ewell

References
 Lt. Gen. Ewell's Report in the Official Records, Series I, Volume XXVII/2 [S# 44]
 Grunder, Charles S. and Beck, Brandon H. The Second Battle of Winchester (2nd Edition). Lynchburg, VA: H.E. Howard, Inc., 1989. 
 Wittenberg, Eric J. and Mingus Sr., Scott L. The Second Battle of Winchester: The Confederate Victory that Opened the Door to Richmond (1st Edition). El Dorado Hills, CA: Savas Beatie LLC, 2016. 
Paths of the Civil War

American Civil War orders of battle